Balatun is a small village located north of the city of Bijeljina in Republika Srpska, Bosnia and Herzegovina.

History
On 24 and 25 September 1992, 22 Bosniaks including seven children were removed from their homes in the village of Bukreš and taken to Balatun where they were killed and thrown into the Drina river.

Notable people
Balatun is the birthplace of Slobodan Pejić, a Bosnian painter and sculptor.

Notes

References

External links
 Bijeljina official website (Serbian)

Bijeljina
Populated places in Bijeljina